Leo Malachi "Sammy" Seward (3 November 1885 – 1 April 1941) was an all-round athlete, who played Australian rules football with University in the Victorian Football League (VFL) where, "among his contemporaries, he was regarded as the cleverest follower of his day".

Family
The second of the five children (one of whom died in his infancy) of Stephen Seward (1853–1923), and Mary Ellen Seward (1849–1935), née Kelleher, Leo Malachi Seward (a.k.a. Leo Malachy Seward) was born at Rochester, Victoria on 3 November 1885.

Siblings
His older brother, Harrie Stephen Seward (1884–1958), was a Member of the Western Australian Legislative Assembly from 1933 to 1950, and a Member of the Australian Senate from 1951 until his death in 1958; his younger brother, Joseph Thomas Lawrence "Tom" Seward (1889–1974), a dental surgeon, served with the First AIF; and his youngest brother, Stephen Aloysius "Steenie" Seward (1892-1982), a farmer, also served with the First AIF.

Marriage
He married Eveleen Josine McCarthy (1884-1967)  the sister of Dr. Kevin McCarthy, President of the Footscray Football Club from 1926 to 1938  in Ballarat, on 19 August 1916. They had four children.

Education
He was educated at St Patrick's College, Ballarat, and at the Ballarat School of Mines.

Football
Given the conditions of the admission of the University team to the VFL competition in 1908, and because he had attended the Ballarat School of Mines, Seward was eligible to play for the University side. 

Even though he played for just one season in the VFL, he played for many years in Ballarat and also a season for the Perth Football Club in the West Australian Football League.

Seward, considered to be a magnificent player, bigger than most others, possessing a long kick and a strong mark, was acknowledged to be one of the finest players of his time.

All-round athlete
He was also a fine all-round sportsman.
Apart from his prowess on the football field Leo [Seward] was also outstanding in many other avenues of life. It will be admitted he was one of the fairest footballers ever to play.At golf and cricket, he excelled. At handball and tennis in his home town (Ballarat) he had few, if any, superiors. As an oarsman and as a swimmer he was again much above the average athlete, and as a pedestrian, notwithstanding his massive frame and height (6ft. 1½ [sic]), he was able to cut out the 100 yards in exceptionally good time. In addition, an occasional break of 100 on the billiard table cost him very little effort.His life was a model for any young man to emulate. Speaking as one who knew him intimately, and appreciated him in full, his memory will ever be my cherished privilege."  "Roxy, Williamstown", (Letter to the Editor), The Sporting Globe, 21 November 1942.

Death
A mining engineer and then a farmer at Beverley, Western Australia, he died in Western Australia on 1 April 1941, in a motoring accident, aged 55.

Notes

References
Holmesby, Russell & Main, Jim (2007). The Encyclopedia of AFL Footballers. 7th ed. Melbourne: Bas Publishing.

External links

1885 births
1941 deaths
People educated at St Patrick's College, Ballarat
Players of Australian handball
Australian male sprinters
Australian rules footballers from Victoria (Australia)
University Football Club players
Perth Football Club players
Road incident deaths in Western Australia